Heart River may refer to:

Rivers
 Heart River (North Dakota), a river in North Dakota, US
 Heart River (Wyoming), a river in Yellowstone National Park, Wyoming, US
 Heart River (Alberta), a river in north-western Alberta, Canada

Place
 Heart River, Alberta, a settlement in Alberta, Canada

See also
 Bad Heart River, a river in north-western Alberta, Canada
 Sick Heart River, a novel by Scottish author John Buchan set in Canada
 Heart (disambiguation)